Mohammed Khadda (14 March 1930 – 4 May 1991) was an Algerian painter, sculptor, and writer. Khadda has been considered to be among the founders of contemporary Algerian painting and one of the many representatives of the "sign painters." He debuted in 1960. His influences included Cubism and  Arabic calligraphy. He tended toward the non-figurative or abstract. He represented a generation of Algerian artists who combined the ideas of calligraphic heritage and formal language of Western formal writing through Western abstraction through the 1950s.

Biography 
Born in Mostaganem, Mohammed Khadda was the eldest of five children, two of whom died while infants. His father, Bendehiba Khadda, was born in 1912 in the town of Mina and moved to Mostaganem at a very young age. He was born blind, yet held various occupations such as a bricklayer and a dock worker. Khadda’s mother, Nebi El Ghali was born in 1911 in Zemora, Algeria, a city near Tiaret. When she was a little girl, her parents were murdered by a settler tribe near where she lived. She, like Mohammed’s father, was also blind, but managed to adjust. Benedehiba and Nebi met in Mostaganem and were married in 1929.

In 1936, Mohammed Khadda attended a school in Tigditt, Mostaganem in an Arab neighborhood. In 1942, he and his family had to leave Mostaganem because of a famine in the area. The family moved to Tiaret and they moved in with his aunt. It was miserable there because their aunt couldn’t provide for them due to her age. Three months later, he returned to Mostaganem and he went back to school. In 1943, he received a diploma from the school. His father wanted him to get a job as soon as he received his diploma, but one of his teachers gave him a year of respite so he did not have to settle for a job he did not enjoy. In 1944, Khadda found a job at a printing company called “Ain Sefra.” During the day, Khadda would draw and make sketches for the printing company. He decided to take on a second job in the evening, binding books for different writers such as Omar Khayyam, Abdou Mohammed, Taha Hussein, Hafid, Jami, André Gide, André Breton, and Jean Cocteau. During the years of resistance against the French, many artists including Khadda went and fought for the National Liberation Army. After finishing with the army, he settled down and his career as an artist slowly began.

Art 
Often working with a palette of earth tones, Khadda created tactile compositions that layer Arabic writing and calligraphy over atmospheric abstract canvases. For the most part, Mohammed Khadda was a self-taught painter of abstract compositions. He used Arabic characters and signs taken from Berber tattoos in his artwork. Though he was self-taught for part of his life, he also had connections with art schools. In 1947, Khadda met Abdallah Benantaur, an artist born in Mostaganem a year after Khadda was born. After their encounter, Khadda enrolled in an École des Beaux-arts [College of Fine Arts] where he learned different art techniques such as watercolors, pastels, and paintings. He continued to expand on his painting techniques by painting scenes of meetings in bookstores and flea markets. In 1948, he and Benantaur went to visit a friend in a hospital sanatorium. It was during this visit that Khadda saw the Museum of Fine Arts where he was inspired by paintings by Eugène Delacroix, Eugène Fromentin, Théodore Chassériau, and Nasreddine Dinet. He was also influenced by sculptures by Auguste Rodin and Antoine Bourdelle.

In 1953, like many other artists from Africa, Mohammed Khadda traveled to Paris, France to continue his education. During that time, he studied under Pablo Picasso and learned the styles of Cubism which greatly influenced his art. He spent a decade in Europe before returning to Algeria. After returning, he worked to set up an art community in Algeria for young aspiring artists to hone their potential skills. In 1964, he and others established the National Union of the Visual Arts. Khadda established the Sign Painters and School of the Sign in 1967. He also illustrated books for Rachid Boudjedra, Tahar Djaout, and others.

Important movements 
Mohammed Khadda was involved in many art movements and organizations throughout his career that have and will continue to influence art in Africa and the rest of the world. Some of these include:

 National Union of the Visual Arts, 1967
 Aouchem (Arabic for tattoo) Art Movement, 1967
 School of Sign, 1967
 "Sign Painters"  
 Created over 70 murals in the 1970s
 Fought with the National Liberation Army during French Resistance

Tribute 
On March 14, 2020, Google celebrated his 90th birthday with a Google Doodle.

See also 
 Culture of Algeria
 Cubism
 Pablo Picasso

References

External links 
 Official site

Calligraphers of Arabic script
Abstract artists
1930 births
1991 deaths
20th-century Algerian painters